Parornix traugotti is a moth of the family Gracillariidae. It is known from Denmark, the Baltic States, Poland, the Central Asian part of Russia and Sweden.

The wingspan is 9–11 mm.

The larvae feed on Betula pubescens. They mine the leaves of their host plant.

References

Parornix
Moths of Europe
Moths of Asia
Moths described in 1976